Calliostoma trotini is a species of sea snail, a marine gastropod mollusc in the family Calliostomatidae.

Range of distribution
This species is endemic to the Philippines. It is found in Balabac Island, Palawan. It is also found in the East China Sea.

Habitat
This top shell lives at depths of about 150 m.

Shell description
The shell is elevated and glossy, conical with straight whorls. The protoconch is white.

Overall color is light olive with a purplish iridescent shine. There are darker blotches just above the suture, on the periphery.

The shell height varies between 8 mm and 12 mm, and the width is up to 11 mm. It is average-sized for the genus.

References

External links
 

trotini
Gastropods described in 2006